Thomas LeRoy Organ, Jr. (born 22 February 1963), known professionally as Tommy Organ or Tommy "O", is an American musician, songwriter and producer.

The son of Thomas LeRoy Organ, Sr. (1940 - 1966 Musician, Army Veteran) and Dorothy Louise Render-Organ (1941 Legal Secretary, Entrepreneur), he began playing music at a very young age.  His brother, Derek LaMont Organ (1961 Musician) is a prolific session drummer.

He has toured with such important artists as, Janet Jackson, Usher, Toni Braxton, TLC and The Jacksons. He also completed studio recordings with Ray Charles, Lionel Richie, Jimmy Jam and Terry Lewis. Tommy has also played in ceremonies of The Grammys, American Music Awards and MTV Music Awards with various artists.
In 2009, Tommy was chosen as a guitarist in Michael Jackson's "This is it" Tour band. After the death of Michael Jackson later that year, Tommy participated in Michael Jackson Tribute shows and as lead guitarist in The Jacksons’ “Unity Tour” in 2012 and 2013.

Life and career

Early years

Picking up the guitar at three years old, Tommy began playing music he heard on the radio by age five. He became a professional musician during high school joining the R&B group, Fantasy. In 1977 at the age of 14, he joined the band 7th Heaven as lead guitar, with Cornelius Mims on bass guitar, Rex Salas on keyboards, his brother Derek Organ on drums, Josef Parson as rhythm guitar, John Bolden on saxophone, Andy Cleves on trumpet and Kipper Jones as lead vocalist. In 1979, 7th Heaven changed the name to Tease.  By the mid-1980s, some new members had joined the band, like Chuckii Booker on keyboards and Jay Shanklin on bass guitar. Tease was founded in California as an R&B/Funk group, performing locally and nationally in the United States such as US Naval bases and top clubs in Los Angeles like "The Roxy" and "Trubador" getting a record deal with RCA Records in 1983, for the recording of their first album, the self-titled Tease. In 1986, the band joined Epic Records, where they recorded two more albums: Tease (second self-titled) in 1986 and Remember in 1988.

Musical Career and Collaborations

In February 1990, with Tease having broken up, Tommy Organ started touring with Janet Jackson on her Rhythm Nation World Tour as guitarist and keyboardist until the end of the tour in November same year; for this work, he was awarded a platinum album plaque commemorating 6 million records sold. He subsequently toured with international artists such as Usher, Toni Braxton, TLC, New Edition, The Jacksons, Anastacia, Ne-Yo, James Ingram, Natalie Cole, Maxwell, Aaron Carter and many more.
Mr. Organ has also completed studio recordings with Ray Charles, Lionel Richie, Melissa Manchester, Brandy, Jimmy Jam and Terry Lewis, Rodney Jerkins, Randy Jackson, Gladys Knight, Mary J. Blige, Beyoncé and Snoop Dogg.
Besides performing, Tommy Organ writes and produces music for other artists such as writing the song "Danger Zone" on Waymon Tisdale's "Power Forward" CD. In addition to being a member of the After Dark with Michael Baisden house band, Tommy has also appeared on the Arsenio Hall Show, Late Night with David Letterman and The Tonight Show with Jay Leno, The Grammys, American Music Awards, MTV Music Awards, The Soul Train Music Awards and Soul Train with various artists.
In spring of 2009, Tommy was chosen as a guitarist in Michael Jackson's "This is it" Concert Tour band. When Jackson unexpectedly died later that year, Tommy was credited as himself in the film chronicling concert rehearsal footage entitled Michael Jackson's "This is it". Tommy had this to say about Jackson's death,“I didn’t believe it,” says Organ. “I kept saying, 'The media is just picking at him again.’ I kept getting phone calls, and I was saying, 'Let me go down to rehearsal because no one’s called me to say it’s cancelled.’ Then I walked into the Staples Centre, my amp was off, and the lights were half-way turned down on stage, and I knew… The day before he was on stage, dancing and singing. Next day, he was gone.”. "He would just fill the room up, man, with joy"
Tommy participated in Michael Jackson Tribute shows all over the world, in addition to performing as lead guitarist in The Jacksons’ “Unity Tour” from 2012 - 2013.
Later in 2009 Tommy Organ collaborated as lead guitarist in the George Lopez Tonight late night television show house band, The Ese Vatos, (headed by "This Is It" musical director Michael Bearden) for two years.
Currently, Tommy is recording and editing his debut solo music compilation "Tommy O", expected to be released at the end of 2016 by "Bentley Records". The first single of this album is called "I want you" and was released on August 26, 2016.

Discography

Studio albums

Released Singles as Solo artist

Studio collaborations

Music videos

Filmography

Equipment

Guitars

 Musicman Reflex 
 Musicman John Petrucci 
 Musicman Silhouette 
 Musicman Luke
 Tregan Guitars by Tommy Organ 
 Minirak 
 Akai 1997
 Fender Telecaster 
 Kent

Pedals

 "Whirlwind Rochester Series"

References

External links

Bentley Records Official website

1963 births
Living people
Musicians from Cleveland